James Woodard (born January 24, 1994) is an American professional basketball player for Hamburg Towers of the German Basketball Bundesliga. He played college basketball at Tulsa from 2012 to 2016.

College career
As a senior at Tulsa in 2015–16, Woodard averaged 15.3 points, 5.2 rebounds and 2.3 assists in 34.1 minutes in 31 appearances. He was named to the First Team All-American Athletic Conference. On November 14, 2015, he scored 23 points and 4 rebounds in an 81–98 win over Central Arkansas Bears.

Professional career
After graduating, on July 8, 2016, Woodard signed with Rouen Métropole of LNB Pro B. On his debut for Rouen Metropole he scored 18 points and 5 rebounds in 76–70 home win against JA Vichy-Clermont Métropole. On August 28, 2017, he signed with Lithuanian basketball club Nevėžis Kėdainiai. On July 27, 2018, he signed with Macedonian basketball club MZT Skopje. On his debut for MZT Skopje on September 27, 2018, he scored 19 points and 4 assists in a 92–79 home win against Helios Suns He was named for MVP of the first round after this game. On June 16, 2019, he signed with Medi Bayreuth.

On July 16, 2020, he has signed with Pallacanestro Cantù of the LBA.

On January 17, 2021, he signed with Peristeri of the Greek Basket League. He averaged 7.3 points, 2.1 rebounds, and 1.4 assists per game.

On July 20, 2021, Woodard signed with MHP Riesen Ludwigsburg of the German Basketball Bundesliga. MHP Riesen Ludwigsburg also plays in the Basketball Champions League.

He signed with Hamburg Towers of the Bundesliga on July 28, 2022.

Personal life
He is the son of Marcus and Petra Woodard. His brother Jordan played basketball for Oklahoma and professionally.

References

External links
Eurobasket.com profile
RealGM profile
Tulsa Golden Hurricane bio

1994 births
Living people
American expatriate basketball people in France
American expatriate basketball people in Germany
American expatriate basketball people in Greece
American expatriate basketball people in Italy
American expatriate basketball people in Lithuania
American men's basketball players
Basketball players from Oklahoma
BC Nevėžis players
Edmond Memorial High School alumni
Hamburg Towers players
KK MZT Skopje players
Medi Bayreuth players
Peristeri B.C. players
Riesen Ludwigsburg players
Shooting guards
Sportspeople from Edmond, Oklahoma
Tulsa Golden Hurricane men's basketball players